Silvia Berger (born July 11, 1980) is a former Austrian skier who participated in 128 World Cup races, with three podium appearances. Throughout the entirety of Berger’s career, her best was a second-place finish in the giant slalom in Val d’Isere on December 9, 1999. Berger is a native of Westendorf. She also managed two third spot placements, in the Veysonnaz super-G on January 11, 2004 and in the Cortina super-G on January 14, 2005.  In her 1999-2000 season, Silvia was crowned Europa Cup Champion in the downhill and giant slalom disciplines, as well as the overall standings.

References

External links
 

1980 births
Living people
Austrian female alpine skiers
20th-century Austrian women
21st-century Austrian women